Crummey Nunatak is a linear rock nunatak,  long, at the northeast end of the Gutenko Nunataks in the Ford Ranges of Marie Byrd Land. It was first mapped by the United States Antarctic Service, 1939–41, and named by the Advisory Committee on Antarctic Names for Glen T. Crummey, U.S. Navy, a Construction Electrician at Byrd Station, 1967.

References 

Nunataks of Marie Byrd Land